The 2020–21 season is Hyderabad cricket team's 87th competitive season. The Hyderabad cricket team is senior men's domestic cricket team based in the city of Hyderabad, India, run by the Hyderabad Cricket Association (HCA). They represent the state of Telangana in domestic competitions.

Squad

Arrivals
Balchander Anirudh got selected to the Hyderabad squad for the first time since his departure to Tamil Nadu in 2017.

Departures
Ambati Rayudu left Hyderabad for the second time in his career to join Andhra despite captaining the side last season. He criticized the previous coach, Arjun Yadav for poor performance of the team during last season while citing politics in the team as the reason for his switch. He played for Hyderabad over ten seasons and also represented India in 55 One Day Internationals and 17 T20 Internationals. Left arm spinner Lalith Mohan opted for Andhra this season after he was overlooked by selectors over last few years. He last played for Hyderabad in 2015.

Players
The following players made at least one appearance for Hyderabad in first-class, List A or Twenty20 cricket in 2020–21 season.  Age given is at the start of Hyderabad's first match of the season (10 January 2021).
Players with international caps are listed in bold.

Competitions

Overview

Syed Mushtaq Ali Trophy

The Syed Mushtaq Ali Trophy, a Twenty20 cricket tournament in India, fixtures were announced by the Board of Control for Cricket in India (BCCI) on 17 December 2020 and the Hyderabad was placed in the Group B with all the group fixtures to be played in a bio-secure hub in Kolkata. Anirudh Singh was appointed as an interim coach for the Hyderabad on December 21 with Zakir Hussain as an assistant coach and Shashank Nag as the fielding coach.

The Hyderabad started their campaign with a loss against the Assam. They won their second match against the Odisha. The losses in their next three matches meant that the Hyderabad failed to qualify for the knockout stage as they finished fifth in the group with one win.

Points table

Matches
Group stage

Ranji Trophy

Owing to the pandemic and curtailed domestic cricket season, the BCCI cancelled the 2020–21 Ranji Trophy season, but gave the go-ahead for the this season's Vijay Hazare Trophy to take place.

Vijay Hazare Trophy

The Vijay Hazare Trophy, a List A cricket tournament in India, fixtures were announced by the Board of Control for Cricket in India (BCCI) on 6 February 2021 and the Hyderabad was placed in the Group A with all the group fixtures to be played in a bio-secure hub in Surat.

Points table

Matches
Group stage

Player statistics

Batting and Fielding

Bowling

References

External links
Hyderabad cricket team official site

Cricket in Hyderabad, India
Cricket in Telangana
Sport in Telangana